Télesphore Saint-Pierre (July 10, 1869, in Lavaltrie, Quebec – October 25, 1912, in Saint-Boniface, Manitoba) was a journalist, writer and editor. He had three children with his wife Stéphanie Guérin, and was a redactor for La Patrie, La Minerve, Le Canada, au Soir, for The Gazette and for Montreal Daily Herald. He was also an author of an "Histoire du commerce canadien-français de Montréal, 1535–1893" (1894) and "Histoire des Canadiens français du Michigan et du comté d'Essex, Ontario" (1895).

References 

People from Lanaudière
1869 births
1912 deaths
Canadian newspaper journalists
Canadian male journalists